Pure Steel Records is a record label based in Germany that focuses on heavy metal music. Pure Steel produces CDs and LPs.

Founded by Kay Anders and Andreas Lorenz in 2006, the main interest of Pure Steel is to spread the true and independent heavy metal sound inspired by the glorious 80s. After 2007, when thrash metal and power metal was growing again they introduced many bands to the metal world. They also collaborate with other labels to re-release notable metal albums on LP.
Pure Steel released the first official tribute to Warlock / Doro Pesch in December 2008.

Bands 
CD bands:
As Darkness Dies, Agamendon, Alltheniko, Angband, Artizan, Arctic Flame, A Tortured Soul, Attick Demons, Blazing Rust, Boomerang, Cage, Conjuring Fate, Chimaera, Commandment, Crom, Crystal Tears, Custard, Deathfist, Desert Sin, Destructor, Dragonsfire, Emerald, Enchanter, Eternal Reign, Exxplorer, Eynomia, Fatal Embrace, Gorgons Eyes, Helvetest Port, Halloween, Hjallarhorn, Holy Cross, Icy Steel, Ice Vinland, In Solitude, Ivory Tower, Jackal, Lanfear, Mortician, Overdrive U.K. Pandea, Phantom-X, Power Theory (US band), Primeval Realm, Project Terror, Razorfist, Salem, Savage Blade, Sencirow, Shadowkeep, Skullview, Split Heaven, Steel Raiser, St. Elmo's Fire, Stormrider, The Prowlers, Thunderblast, Titan Steele, Trauma, Ursus, Valkyrie's Cry, Warcry, Warrant, Widow, Wolfs Moon, Wretch (US), Zandelle, Sacrilege, Lost Legacy (US band)
 LP bands:
Aska, Avenger, Cage, Crescent Shield, Emerald, Fatal Embrace, Pharaoh, Sacred Steel, Salem, Seasons of the Wolf, Shadowkeep, Steel Prophet, Trauma

Distribution 
Distribution is handled through Soulfood GmbH in Europe.

See also 
 List of record labels
 GEMA (Germany)

References

External links 
 Pure Steel at Facebook
 Pure Steel at Last.fm

German independent record labels
Heavy metal record labels
Rock record labels
Record labels established in 2006